Lionel Chalmers, Jr. (born November 10, 1980) is an American former professional basketball player who currently works as an assistant coach for the Orlando Magic of the National Basketball Association (NBA). He is 6'0" (1.83 m) in height and played at the point guard position.

Amateur career
Chalmers played his first three years of high school basketball at Notre Dame-Bishop Gibbons in Schenectady, New York.  He then transferred to Albany High School for his senior year.

Chalmers attended Xavier University, where he played college basketball for four years as an undergraduate and later as a graduate student. As a senior, he led Xavier to the Elite Eight round of the NCAA Tournament. He was inducted into the Xavier University Athletic Hall of Fame in 2015.

Professional career
Chalmers was drafted by the Los Angeles Clippers in the second round of the 2004 NBA Draft with the 33rd overall pick. He played in 34 games in the 2004–05 season with the Clippers, averaging 3.1 points per game and 1.4 assists per game in 12.0 minutes per game. He was traded to the Minnesota Timberwolves on August 20, 2005, along with Marko Jaric in exchange for Sam Cassell. He played for the Timberwolves in the 2005–06 NBA preseason, but he was released into free agency before the regular season commenced.

He played in the Greek A1 league with AEK Athens BC from November 2005 to February 2006, when he then joined TAU Cerámica of the Spanish ACB.

He played with the Phoenix Suns' summer league team during the summer of 2006, but he was not retained by the Suns. He also played for the Atlanta Hawks during the 2006 preseason. After the Hawks waived him before the regular season began, Chalmers signed with Dinamo Banco di Sardegna Sassari of the Italian second division in December 2006. In May 2007, he signed with the Spanish ACB club Basket CAI Zaragoza.

In July 2007, Chalmers moved to the Italian first division team Benetton Treviso. After spending a season in Italy, he signed with the Russian club Universitet Yugra Surgut. He had a successful season in Surgut, as he was the top scorer of the Russian Basketball Super League with 21.4 points per game. In the 2009–10 season he played with another Super League club, Enisey Krasnoyarsk. In July 2010 he signed with BC Lokomotiv Kuban. In 2012, he joined Aliağa Petkim of Turkey. In October 2013, he signed a one-year deal with Levski Sofia. With them he won the National Basketball League of Bulgaria.

In July 2014, he signed with Chalons-Reims of the French LNB Pro A. On January 9, 2015, he parted ways with them.

Coaching career
Chalmers began his coaching career in 2017 as a video coordinator of the Orlando Magic, becoming an associate coach/player development two years later. On August 8, 2021, he became one of the most important full time assistant coach with the Magic.

Personal
Lionel's cousin, Mario Chalmers, formerly of the Kansas Jayhawks, was picked in the second round of the 2008 NBA Draft by the Minnesota Timberwolves. He was later traded to the Miami Heat, with whom he won 2 consecutive NBA championships. He also has a wife and 3 children.

Notes

External links 
NBA.com Profile
Player profile @ aek.com
Player profile @ legaduebasket.it

1980 births
Living people
AEK B.C. players
African-American basketball players
Aliağa Petkim basketball players
American expatriate basketball people in Bulgaria
American expatriate basketball people in France
American expatriate basketball people in Greece
American expatriate basketball people in Italy
American expatriate basketball people in Russia
American expatriate basketball people in Spain
American expatriate basketball people in Turkey
American men's basketball players
Basketball players from New York (state)
Basket Zaragoza players
BC Enisey players
BC Levski Sofia players
Dinamo Sassari players
Greek Basket League players
Liga ACB players
Los Angeles Clippers draft picks
Los Angeles Clippers players
Pallacanestro Treviso players
PBC Lokomotiv-Kuban players
Point guards
Reims Champagne Basket players
Saski Baskonia players
Sportspeople from Albany, New York
Xavier Musketeers men's basketball players
21st-century African-American sportspeople
20th-century African-American people